In mathematics, and more specifically in abstract algebra, a rng (or non-unital ring or pseudo-ring) is an algebraic structure satisfying the same properties as a ring, but without assuming the existence of a multiplicative identity. The term rng is meant to suggest that it is a ring without i, that is, without the requirement for an identity element.

There is no consensus in the community as to whether the existence of a multiplicative identity must be one of the ring axioms (see ). The term rng was coined to alleviate this ambiguity when people want to refer explicitly to a ring without the axiom of multiplicative identity.

A number of algebras of functions considered in analysis are not unital, for instance the algebra of functions decreasing to zero at infinity, especially those with compact support on some (non-compact) space.

Definition 

Formally, a rng is a set R with two binary operations  called addition and multiplication such that
 (R, +) is an abelian group,
 (R, ·) is a semigroup,
 Multiplication distributes over addition.

A rng homomorphism is a function  from one rng to another such that
 f(x + y) = f(x) + f(y)
 f(x · y) = f(x) · f(y)
for all x and y in R.

If R and S are rings, then a ring homomorphism  is the same as a rng homomorphism  that maps 1 to 1.

Examples 

All rings are rngs. A simple example of a rng that is not a ring is given by the even integers with the ordinary addition and multiplication of integers. Another example is given by the set of all 3-by-3 real matrices whose bottom row is zero. Both of these examples are instances of the general fact that every (one- or two-sided) ideal is a rng.

Rngs often appear naturally in functional analysis when linear operators on infinite-dimensional vector spaces are considered.  Take for instance any infinite-dimensional vector space V and consider the set of all linear operators  with finite rank (i.e. ). Together with addition and composition of operators, this is a rng, but not a ring. Another example is the rng of all real sequences that converge to 0, with component-wise operations.

Also, many test function spaces occurring in the theory of distributions consist of functions
decreasing to zero at infinity, like e.g. Schwartz space. Thus, the function everywhere equal to one, which would be the only possible identity element for pointwise multiplication, cannot exist in such spaces, which therefore are rngs (for pointwise addition and multiplication). In particular, the real-valued continuous functions with compact support defined on some topological space, together with pointwise addition and multiplication, form a rng; this is not a ring unless the underlying space is compact.

Example: even integers 

The set 2Z of even integers is closed under addition and multiplication and has an additive identity, 0, so it is a rng, but it does not have a multiplicative identity, so it is not a ring.

In 2Z, the only multiplicative idempotent is 0, the only nilpotent is 0, and the only element with a reflexive inverse is 0.

Example: finite quinary sequences
The direct sum  equipped with coordinate-wise addition and multiplication is a rng with the following properties:
 Its idempotent elements form a lattice with no upper bound.

Properties

Adjoining an identity element (Dorroh extension) 

Every rng R can be enlarged to a ring R^ by adjoining an identity element.  A general way in which to do this is to formally add an identity element 1 and let R^ consist of integral linear combinations of 1 and elements of R with the premise that none of its nonzero integral multiples coincide or are contained in R.  That is, elements of R^ are of the form
n · 1 + r
Multiplication is defined by linearity:
(n1 + r1) · (n2 + r2) = n1n2 + n1r2 + n2r1 + r1r2.

More formally, we can take R^ to be the cartesian product  and define addition and multiplication by
(n1, r1) + (n2, r2) = (n1 + n2, r1 + r2),
(n1, r1) · (n2, r2) = (n1n2, n1r2 + n2r1 + r1r2).
The multiplicative identity of R^ is then . This map has the following universal property:
Given any ring S and any rng homomorphism , there exists a unique ring homomorphism  such that .

There is a natural surjective ring homomorphism  which sends  to n.  The kernel of this homomorphism is the image of R in R^.  Since j is injective, we see that R is embedded as a (two-sided) ideal in R^ with the quotient ring R^/R isomorphic to Z.  It follows that
Every rng is an ideal in some ring, and every ideal of a ring is a rng.

Note that j is never surjective.  So, even when R already has an identity element, the ring R^ will be a larger one with a different identity. The ring R^ is often called the Dorroh extension of R after the American mathematician Joe Lee Dorroh, who first constructed it.

The process of adjoining an identity element to a rng can be formulated in the language of category theory.  If we denote the category of all rings and ring homomorphisms by Ring and the category of all rngs and rng homomorphisms by Rng, then Ring is a (nonfull) subcategory of Rng.  The construction of R^ given above yields a left adjoint to the  inclusion functor .  Notice that Ring is not a reflective subcategory of Rng because the inclusion functor is not full.

Properties weaker than having an identity 

There are several properties that have been considered in the literature that are weaker than having an identity element, but not so general. 
For example:

 Rings with enough idempotents: A rng R is said to be a ring with enough idempotents when there exists a subset E of R given by orthogonal (i.e.  for all  in E) idempotents (i.e.  for all e in E) such that .
 s-unital rings: A rng R is said to be s-unital in case for every finite set r1, r2, ..., rt in R we can find s in R such that  for every i.
 Idempotent rings: A rng R is said to be idempotent (or an irng) in case , that is, for every element r of R we can find elements ri and si in R such that .

It is not hard to check that these properties are weaker than having an identity element and weaker than the previous one.

 Rings are rings with enough idempotents, using  A ring with enough idempotents that has no identity is for example the ring of infinite matrices over a field with just a finite number of nonzero entries. The matrices that have just 1 over one element in the main diagonal and 0 otherwise are the orthogonal idempotents.
 Rings with enough idempotents are rings with local units just taking finite sums of the orthogonal idempotents to satisfy the definition.
 Rings with local units are in particular s-unital; s-unital rings are firm and firm rings are idempotent.

Rng of square zero 

A rng of square zero is a rng R such that  for all x and y in R.
Any abelian group can be made a rng of square zero by defining the multiplication so that  for all x and y; thus every abelian group is the additive group of some rng.
The only rng of square zero with a multiplicative identity is the zero ring {0}.

Any additive subgroup of a rng of square zero is an ideal.  Thus a rng of square zero is simple if and only if its additive group is a simple abelian group, i.e., a cyclic group of prime order.

Unital homomorphism 

Given two unital algebras A and B, an algebra homomorphism

f : A → B

is unital if it maps the identity element of A to the identity element of B.

If the associative algebra A over the field K is not unital, one can adjoin an identity element as follows: take  as underlying K-vector space and define multiplication ∗ by

(x, r) ∗ (y, s) = (xy + sx + ry, rs)

for x, y in A and r, s in K. Then ∗ is an associative operation with identity element . The old algebra A is contained in the new one, and in fact  is the "most general" unital algebra containing A, in the sense of universal constructions.

See also
 Semiring

Notes

References 

 
 

 
 
 

 

Ring theory
Algebraic structures
Algebras

he:חוג (מבנה אלגברי)#איבר יחידה